Henri Buisson (18731944) was a French physicist. Buisson and Charles Fabry discovered the ozone layer in 1913.

Buisson was born on 15 July 1873 in Paris and died on 6 January 1944 in Marseille, at age 70.

References

1873 births
1944 deaths
French physicists